Lisa Marie-Louise Verschueren (born 14 June 1995) is a retired Belgian artistic gymnast.

Biography
In 2014, aged 18, she was crowned Belgian all-around champion in Mechelen, scoring 14.000 on vault, 13.800 on uneven bars, 12.633 on beam, and 12.766 on floor exercise, for an all-around score of 53.199.

In October of the same year she participated in the 2014 World Artistic Gymnastics Championships with Belgium, finishing eleventh. In June 2015 she and Gaelle Mys led Belgium to a silver in the first edition of the Flanders Team Challenge, won by Germany.

In 2015 she finished fourth on floor exercise at the 2015 European Games in Baku, missing the podium only narrowly.

In December 2015 she retired from artistic gymnastics due to a heart condition.

Competitive history

References

1995 births
Living people
Belgian female artistic gymnasts
Sportspeople from Sint-Niklaas
European Games competitors for Belgium
Gymnasts at the 2015 European Games